Victoria Tin-bor Hui (Chinese: 許田波) is a Hong Kong exiled pro-democracy activist and political scientist whose main interests include state formation, history of international relations, Confucianism, contentious politics, politics of China and Hong Kong. She is an Associate Professor at University of Notre Dame. Hui earned a B.SSc. in Journalism and Communication from the Chinese University of Hong Kong in 1990. She completed her MA and Ph.D. in Political Science at. Hui is a member and co-founder of the Washington, DC-based Hong Kong Democracy Council (HKDC). She has written on Hong Kong’s democracy movement for Foreign Policy Research Institute, Foreign Affairs and ChinaFile.

Works

Books
War and State Formation in China and Early Modern Europe (Cambridge University Press, 2005)

Highly-cited journal articles
Testing Balance-of-Power Theory in World History. European Journal of International Relations (2007)
Toward a Dynamic Theory of International Politics: Insights from Comparing Ancient China and Early Modern Europe.  International Organization (2004)

References

Living people
Hong Kong democracy activists
Year of birth missing (living people)